MAAC may refer to:
 Maya Academy of Advanced Cinematics, an institute related to the Indian animation industry
Metro Atlantic Athletic Conference, an NCAA Division-I affiliated athletic conference
Model Aeronautics Association of Canada
Movimiento Auténtico Autónomo Costeño